is a city in Aichi Prefecture, Japan. Kitanagoya is a member of the World Health Organization’s Alliance for Healthy Cities (AFHC).

Geography

Kitanagoya is located in the northwest region of Aichi Prefecture. The city lies within a 10 kilometers range of downtown Nagoya and is relatively small. The city is about 6 kilometers from east to west, and about 4 kilometers from north to south. The city is located in the heart of Nōbi Plain, approximately five meters above sea level. There are numerous rivers, including the Gojō River, Shin River, and Aise River, which create a natural biosphere.

Climate
The city has a climate characterized by hot and humid summers, and relatively mild winters (Köppen climate classification Cfa).  The average annual temperature in Kitanagoya is 15.7 °C. The average annual rainfall is 1718 mm with September as the wettest month. The temperatures are highest on average in August, at around 28.2 °C, and lowest in January, at around 4.3 °C.

Demographics
Per Japanese census data, the population of Kitanagoya has increased rapidly over the past 60 years.

Surrounding municipalities
Aichi Prefecture
Ichinomiya
Komaki
Iwakura
Kiyosu
Toyoyama
Nagoya

History

Late modern period
The area of present-day Kitanagoya was part of rural Nishikasugai District, Aichi from 1889.
The area began to develop in the Taishō period with the development of the Meitetsu Inuyama train line.

Contemporary history
The town of Shikatsu was created on April 1, 1961, followed by Nishiharu on November 1, 1963, as the population increased due to increasing industrialization of the area.
The two towns were merged to create the city of Kitanagoya on March 20, 2006.

Government

Kitanagoya has a mayor-council form of government with a directly elected mayor and a unicameral city legislature of 21 members. The city contributes two members to the Aichi Prefectural Assembly.  In terms of national politics, the city is part of Aichi District 5 of the lower house of the Diet of Japan.

External relations

Twin towns – Sister cities

International
Muan County（South Jeolla Province, South Korea）
since January 9, 2008

Economy
Due to its location adjacent to the Nagoya metropolis, which is only ten minutes away by express train, Kitanagoya is largely a commuter town. However, agriculture is also highly developed, using the productive fertile soil and land with an alluvial fan created by Kiso and Shōnai River.

Education

University
The Nagoya University of Arts is also located in Kitanagoya.
Nagoya University of Arts

Schools
Kitanagoya has ten public elementary schools and six public junior high schools operated by the city government, and one public high school operated by the Aichi Prefectural Board of Education.

Transportation

Railways

Conventional lines
 Meitetsu
Inuyama Line：-  –  –

Roads

Expressway
 Route 16 (Nagoya Expressway)

Japan National Route

Notable people from Kitanagoya

Takuya Ishida, actor
Atsunori Inaba, professional baseball player
Kiyoshi Hatanaka, professional boxer

References

External links

 Kitanagoya City official website 
 Kitanagoya City official website 
 Kitanagoya City Council of Socialwelfare 
 Address list of Kitanagoya 
 Weather forecast of Kitanagoya 

Cities in Aichi Prefecture
Kitanagoya, Aichi